Mount Logan is the highest mountain in Canada and the second-highest peak in North America after Denali. The mountain was named after Sir William Edmond Logan, a Canadian geologist and founder of the Geological Survey of Canada (GSC). Mount Logan is the source of the Hubbard and Logan glaciers.

Due to active tectonic uplifting, Mount Logan is still rising in height (approximately 0.35 mm per year). In May 1992, a GSC expedition climbed Mount Logan and fixed the current height of  using GPS.

Temperatures are extremely low on and near Mount Logan.

Peaks of the massif

Discovery and naming 
Mount Logan is not readily visible from the surrounding lowlands or the coast, due to its position in the heart of the Saint Elias Mountains, although it can be seen from  out to sea. Its first reported sighting was in 1890 by Israel C. Russell, during an expedition to nearby Mount Saint Elias, from the crest of the Pinnacle Pass Hills. He wrote: "The clouds parting toward the northeast revealed several giant peaks not before seen... One stranger, rising in three white domes far above the clouds, was especially magnificent". Russell gave the mountain its present name.

In 1898, Denali was determined to be higher.

Ascent attempts

First ascent

In 1922, a geologist approached the Alpine Club of Canada with the suggestion that the club send a team to the mountain to reach the summit for the first time. An international team of Canadian, British and American climbers was assembled the following year, initially planning an attempt in 1924 but forced by funding and preparation delays to postpone the trip until 1925. The international team of climbers began their journey in early May, crossing the mainland from the Pacific coast by train. They then walked the remaining  to within  of the Logan Glacier where they established base camp. In the early evening of June 23, 1925, Albert H. MacCarthy (leader), H.F. Lambart, Allen Carpé, W.W. Foster, Norman H. Read and Andy Taylor stood on top for the first time.  It had taken them 65 days to approach the mountain from the nearest town (McCarthy across the border in Alaska), reach the summit, and return, with all climbers intact, although some of them suffered severe frostbite.

Subsequent notable ascents and attempts

 1957 East Ridge. Don Monk, Gil Roberts and three others (US) reached the East Peak on July 19 after a 24-day climb.
1959 East Ridge, second ascent and first alpine-style ascent, Hans Gmoser and five others (Canada). Starting from Kluane Lake, they hiked and skied  to reach the base of the mountain. They climbed the ridge in six days and summited the East Peak on June 12.
 1965 Hummingbird Ridge (South Ridge). Dick Long, Allen Steck, Jim Wilson, John Evans, Franklin Coale Sr. and Paul Bacon (US) over 30 days, mid-July to Mid-August. Fred Beckey remarked: "When they got back we just couldn't believe that they had climbed that thing. We didn't think they had a chance". Featured in Fifty Classic Climbs of North America. As of 2023 the climb remains unrepeated.
 1967, August, the first ski descent of the mountain was made in two stages by Daniel C. Taylor main summit to the Kluane glacier 
 1977 Warbler Ridge. Dave Jones, Frank Baumann, Fred Thiessen, Jay Page (all from Canada) and Rene Bucher (Swiss) in 22 days.
 1978  West Ridge. Steve Davis (WA), Jon Waterman, George Sievewright, Roger Hurt (NH). Climbed ridge in 27 days "capsule-style".
 1979 Northwest Ridge Michael Down (CA), Paul Kindree, John Howe, Reid Carter and John Wittmayer climbed to the summit over 22 days, topping out on June 19.
 1979 South-Southwest Ridge. Raymond Jotterand (CA), Alan Burgess, Jim Elzinga and John Lauchlan reached the summit after 15 days of climbing on June 30 and July 1.
 1986 First winter ascent by Todd Frankiewicz, Willy Hersman, Steve Koslow, George Rooney, Vernon Tejas and John Bauman via the King’s Trench Route on March 16.
 1987 David Cheesmond and Catherine Freer disappeared while attempting to repeat the Hummingbird Ridge.
 1992 June 6, an expedition sponsored by the Royal Canadian Geographic Society confirmed the height of Mount Logan using GPS. The leader was Michael Schmidt, with Lisel Currie, Leo Nadeay, Charlie Roots, J-C. Lavergne, Roger Laurilla, Patrick Morrow, Karl Nagy, Sue Gould, Alan Björn, Lloyd Freese, Kevin McLaughlin and Rick Staley.
 2005 late May. Three climbers from the Vancouver-based North Shore Rescue team became stranded on the mountain. A joint operation by Canadian and American forces rescued the three climbers and took them to Anchorage, Alaska for treatment of frostbite.
 2017 May 23. 15-year-old Naomi Prohaska reached the summit, the youngest person to do so. She was part of a team led by her father.
 2018 June 14. The first all US veteran team reached the summit. The six-person team was unguided and part of the US non-profit organization Veterans Expeditions.

Climbing Rules 
In January 2020, due to the expensive cost of search and rescue operations in recent years, Parks Canada announced new rules for climbing Mt. Logan:
 No solo expeditions
 No winter expeditions (which also includes all of Kluane National Park)
 Climbers must have insurance to cover the cost of search and rescue.
There have been eight rescue missions in the past seven years in Kluane National Park. Each mission typically costs between $60,000 to $100,000 CAD which is paid for by Canadian taxpayers. A Parks Canada spokesperson said the new rules are to help reduce the financial burden to taxpayers.

Proposed renaming
Following the death of former Prime Minister of Canada Pierre Trudeau in 2000, then Prime Minister Jean Chrétien, a close friend of Trudeau, proposed renaming the mountain Mount Trudeau.
However opposition from Yukoners, mountaineers, geologists, Trudeau's political critics, and many other Canadians forced the plan to be dropped. A mountain in British Columbia's Premier Range was named Mount Pierre Elliott Trudeau instead.

See also

List of mountain peaks of North America
List of mountain peaks of Canada
List of highest points of Canadian provinces and territories
List of Ultras in Canada
List of elevation extremes by country

References

Bibliography
  [The climbing history up to 1939 of Mount Logan, Snowdon, Ben Nevis, Ushba, Everest, Nanga Parbat, Kanchenjunga, the Matterhorn, Aoraki / Mount Cook and Mont Blanc.]

External links

 
 2009 Trip Report
 Mount Logan Canadian Titan - Virtual Museum of Canada

Five-thousanders of Yukon
Saint Elias Mountains
Lists of coordinates
Kluane National Park and Reserve
Seven Second Summits
Highest points of countries